Thomas J. Duff was an architect noted for his design of a number of religious buildings for the Roman Catholic Archdiocese of New York during its major expansion at the beginning of the 20th century.

His firm was headquartered at 407 West 14th Street, Manhattan, and in Mount Vernon in Westchester County.

Buildings designed by Duff
Saint Malachy's Roman Catholic Church (1903) on West 49th Street in Manhattan.
Immaculate Conception Church (1908) in Tuckahoe
St. Lucy's Church (1914–15) on East 104th Street in Manhattan.
Rectory of St. Cecilia Parish (1927) at 125 East 106th Street in Manhattan.

References

Architects of Roman Catholic churches
Defunct architecture firms based in New York City
Architects from New York City
American ecclesiastical architects